Bela erosa is a species of sea snail, a marine gastropod mollusk in the family Mangeliidae.

Description
The length of the shell attains 17 mm, its diameter 6 mm.

The shell is longitudinally ribbed and spirally striated. There is a narrow, brown  band at the suture, with sometimes a darker band at the suture and another at the base.

Distribution
This species occurs in the Strait of Tartary between the Russian island of Sakhalin and mainland Asia.

References

 Kantor Yu.I. & Sysoev A.V. (2006) Marine and brackish water Gastropoda of Russia and adjacent countries: an illustrated catalogue. Moscow: KMK Scientific Press. 372 pp. + 140 pls.

External links

erosa